The  was the second season of the nationwide fourth tier of Japanese football, and the 17th season since the establishment of Japan Football League. The first stage of the season was played from 8 March to 7 June, and the second stage of the season from 20 June to 15 November, while post-season championship playoffs were held on 29 November and 5 December.

Clubs
Sixteen clubs will participate in this second season of Japan Football League. The list was announced on 16 January. A place for 2015 Emperor's Cup will be given to the winners of the first stage of the JFL 2015.

On 29 October SP Kyoto FC announced their withdrawal from JFL at the end of the season.

Change in rules
The tournament will continue with the system introduced in 2014: Two single round-robin stages will be held, and winners of each stage will determine the champion in the post-season home and away championship playoffs. If the same team manages to win both stages, no playoffs will be held, and they will be automatically declared champions.

The two worst teams by aggregated results of both stages were relegated to the Regional Leagues and replaced by the top two performers of the Regional League promotion series. However, if one or two teams would be admitted to J3 or withdrawn at the end of the season, the number of relegated clubs would be reduced accordingly. As a result of SP Kyoto FC's withdrawal, no club was relegated.

According to updated J.League Terms, the clubs must comply the following requirements to be promoted to J3 League:
Play in JFL for at least one season before promotion
Hold a J. League 100 Year Plan club status
Finish in top 4 of the combined JFL table, and finish either 1st or 2nd among associate members.
Have an average home attendance of at least 2,000; with significant effort recognized toward reaching 3,000 spectators
Have an annual operating revenue of 150 million yen
Pass the J3 licensing examination conducted by J.League

First stage

Second stage

Championship play-offs
The championship play-offs will be held after the season between two winners of each stage. Vanraure Hachinohe, the winners of the first stage, hosted the first leg on 29 November, and Sony Sendai who won the second stage hosted the second leg on 5 December.

|}

Overall table
This table was used to determine J3 promotion candidates. To qualify for promotion, a club must hold a 100 Year Plan status, obtain J3 license (marked in bold in the table), and finish both in the top 4 of the JFL, and either 1st or 2nd among the promotion-eligible clubs.

On 25 September J.League has awarded J3 licenses for 2016 season. Among JFL clubs, only Kagoshima United, Azul Claro Numazu, and Nara Club received the licenses.

On 17 November J.League officially promoted Kagoshima United to next year's J3 League.

Top scorers

Updated to games played on 15 November 2015Source: JFL Stats & Data - Ranking:Goals

Attendance

Promotion from Regional Leagues
Due to SP Kyoto's resignation and Kagoshima's promotion, two promotion slots were available for the winners of the Regional League promotion series. In the final group tournament that took place from 21 to 23 November ReinMeer Aomori and Briobecca Urayasu finished first and second, respectively, and won promotion to 2016 JFL.

References

External links
Official website

2015
4